This is a list of cricketers who have played first-class, List A or Twenty20 cricket for Saurashtra cricket team. Seasons given are first and last seasons; the player did not necessarily play in all the intervening seasons. Players in bold have played international cricket.

B
Mohammad Baluch, 1972/73
V. J. Barai, 1967/68
DS Bhatt

D

F

J
P. Jadeja, 1979/80

L
Laheji, 1954/55

M

N
V.L. Nakum 1945/46 - 1962/63
Sandil Natkan, 2006/07

P
Manoj Parmar, 1991/92, 2001/02

R
Y. Radia

S
Iqbal Seth, 1959/60
Rajendra Shah, 1971/76

U
Urmikant Mody, 1965/1966 - 1967/1968

V
Suresh Vaghjiani, 1963/64
Vatsal Trivedi,  2005/06

Z
Harpal Zala, 1955/56

References 

Saurashtra cricketers

cricketers